Lech Poznań is a Polish football club based in Poznań. This was their 98th season overall. They competed in Ekstraklasa, the highest ranking league in Poland.

Due to COVID-19 pandemic in Poland in all Ekstraklasa and Polish Cup matches the number of spectators may reach at maximum 50% of stadium capacity. All UEFA Europa League qualification rounds were played behind closed doors. On 1 October 2020 UEFA announced that the group stage games of 2020–21 competition will be opened for fans in a number of at maximum 30% of stadium capacity. On 15 October 2020 Polish government had closed stands for sport teams supporters due to a significant increase of the number of people infected with the COVID-19 disease.

Club

Coaching staff

Total income:  €16,300,000

Total expenditure:  €15,600,000

Winter transfer window

In

|}

Total spending:  €1,300,000

Out

|}

Total income:  €50,000

Total expenditure:  €1,250,000

Friendlies

Competitions

Overview

Ekstraklasa

League table

Results summary

Results by round

Matches

Polish Cup

UEFA Europa League

Qualifying phase

Group stage

Group D

Squad Statistics

Appearances and goals

|-
! colspan=11 style="background:#000099; color:white"; text-align:center| Goalkeepers
|-

|-
! colspan=11 style="background:#000099; color:white"; text-align:center| Defenders
|-

|-
! colspan=11 style="background:#000099; color:white"; text-align:center| Midfielders
|-

|-
! colspan=11 style="background:#000099; color:white"; text-align:center| Forwards
|-

|-
!colspan="11" style="background:#000099; color:white"; text-align:center|Players who appeared for Lech and left the club during the season:
|-

|}

Goalscorers

Assists

Clean sheets

Disciplinary Record

Home attendances

References

Lech Poznan
Lech Poznań seasons